Daejeon Gwanjeo High School (hangeul: 대전관저고등학교 hanja: 大田關雎高等學校) is a high school in Seo-gu, Daejeon, South Korea. This public, coeducational college preparatory high school was founded on 5 March 1998 with the permission of Korean Ministry of Education and Human Resource.  Abbreviation of Daejeon Gwanjeo High School is DGHS.

Symbol 
Its name Gwanjeo (hanja: 關雎) is derived from a poem in Shi Jing. In this Chinese poem, Gwanjeo (hanja: 關雎) is pronounced in Guanju (simplified chinese: 关雎; pinyin: guānjū). In old Chinese, Guanju was a kind of osprey. On the logo of DGHS, kissing are two white birds that symbolize Gwanjeo (Guanju).

External links
 (Korean) Daejeon Gwanjeo High School

Schools in Daejeon
High schools in South Korea
Seo District, Daejeon
Educational institutions established in 1998
1998 establishments in South Korea